Forks Township is a township in Northampton County, Pennsylvania. The population of Forks Township was 14,721 as of the 2010 census.  It is part of the Lehigh Valley metropolitan area, which had a population of 861,899 and was the 68th most populous metropolitan area in the U.S. as of the 2020 census. The township is home to the global headquarters of Crayola, founded in 1885, a global arts supply company and the world's leading manufacturer of crayons. 

Geography
It is drained by the Delaware River, which separates it from New Jersey. Its villages include Chestnut Hill, Churchville, Keplers Mill, Sandts Eddy (also in Lower Mount Bethel Township), Uhlers Station, and Zucksville. The township was named Forks since it lies at the "fork" of the Delaware and Lehigh Rivers.

Neighboring municipalities
Easton (south)
Wilson (tangent to the south)
Palmer Township (west)
Tatamy (north northwest )
Stockertown (northwest)
Plainfield Township (north)
Lower Mount Bethel Township (northeast)
Harmony Township, New Jersey (east)
Lopatcong Township, New Jersey (east)

Transportation

Pennsylvania Route 611 is the only numbered highway traversing Forks Township. It runs north-to-south through the township along the Delaware River. Other local roads of note include Bushkill Drive, Frost Hollow Road, Kesslersville Road, Knox Avenue/Sullivan Trail, Newlins Road, Richmond Road, Uhler Road, and Zucksville Road.

Demographics

At the 2000 census there were 8,419 people, 3,035 households, and 2,415 families living in the township.  The population density was 698.2 people per square mile (269.5/km2).  There were 3,159 housing units at an average density of 262.0/sq mi (101.1/km2).  The racial makeup of the township was 94.92% White, 2.24% African American, 0.05% Native American, 1.39% Asian, 0.01% Pacific Islander, 0.62% from other races, and 0.77% from two or more races. Hispanic or Latino of any race were 2.05%.

There were 3,035 households, 39.8% had children under the age of 18 living with them, 70.7% were married couples living together, 6.3% had a female householder with no husband present, and 20.4% were non-families. 17.0% of households were made up of individuals, and 6.8% were one person aged 65 or older.  The average household size was 2.76 and the average family size was 3.13. The age distribution was 27.6% under the age of 18, 4.3% from 18 to 24, 31.3% from 25 to 44, 24.1% from 45 to 64, and 12.7% 65 or older.  The median age was 39 years. For every 100 females, there were 95.7 males.  For every 100 females age 18 and over, there were 94.1 males. The median household income was $66,055 and the median family income was $70,587. Males had a median income of $51,965 versus $30,661 for females. The per capita income for the township was $26,180.  About 2.7% of families and 3.0% of the population were below the poverty line, including 2.7% of those under age 18 and 6.0% of those age 65 or over.

Public education
The township is served by the Easton Area School District, and is home to three of the school district's schools: Shawnee Elementary, Forks Elementary, and Easton Area Middle School for grades five through eight. Students in grades nine through 12 attend Easton Area High School in Easton.

References

External links

Official township website

Pennsylvania populated places on the Delaware River
Townships in Northampton County, Pennsylvania
Townships in Pennsylvania